Reynolds Peak is a prominent peak (785 m) rising 6 nautical miles (11 km) northwest of Eld Peak on the west side of Matusevich Glacier. Two conical peaks were sighted in the area from the Peacock on January 16, 1840, by Passed Midshipmen William Reynolds and Henry Eld of the United States Exploring Expedition (1838–42). The northwestern peak was named for Reynolds by USEE leader Lieutenant Charles Wilkes.

In 1959 Phillip Law of ANARE (Australian National Antarctic Research Expeditions) made investigations of features in this area. Reference to Wilkes' narrative showed that the recorded descriptions of the peaks seen by Reynolds and Eld to be in accord with photographs of the peaks on the west side of Matusevich Glacier. The peak described was selected by Law to commemorate Wilkes' naming.

References

Mountains of Oates Land